Qahrizjan (also Romanized as Qahrīzjān; also known as Kārīzgun and Mahrīz Jān) is a village in Karvan-e Sofla Rural District, Karvan District, Tiran and Karvan County, Isfahan Province, Iran. At the 2006 census, its population was 1,779, in 448 families.

References 

Populated places in Tiran and Karvan County